Ivan Shevtsov (Шевцов, Иван Михайлович; 1920–2013) was a Soviet novelist, known in the West for the anti-semitic aspects of his 1965 novel Aphid.

References

1920 births
2013 deaths
Soviet novelists
Maxim Gorky Literature Institute alumni